List of Mills College, Oakland, California, U.S.A., honorary degree recipients:
 2011 – Janet L. Holmgren 
 2011 – May Ohmura Watanabe
 2010 – Dolores Huerta 
 2010 – Nancy Pelosi 
 2010 – Betty Wo
 2009 – Stephanie Mills 
 2009 – Kavita Ramdas 
 2009 – Renel Brooks-Moon '81 
 2008 – Glenn Voyles 
 2008 – Rita Moreno 
 2007 – Shirley M. Tilghman
 2007 – Roselyne Chroman Swig 
 2006 – Barbara Boxer 
 2005 – Vivian M. Stephenson
 2005 – Ronald V. Dellums 
 2004 – Lorry I. Lokey 
 2004 – Pauline Oliveros
 2003 – Lois De Domenico
 2003 – Earl F. Cheit
 2003 – Eleanor Holmes Norton
 2002 –  '66 
 2001 – Antonia Hernández
 2001 – Suzanne Adams
 2000 – Herma Hill Kay
 2000 – Mary Catherine Bateson
 2000 – Isabel Allende 
 1999 – Barbara Lee '73
 1999 – Lenore Blum
 1999 – Johnnetta Cole
 1998 – Eleanor Hadley '38
 1998 – Anita L. DeFrantz
 1997 – Trisha Brown
 1997 – Chang-Lin Tien
 1997 – Evelyn Cisneros
 1996 – Marian Wright Edelman
 1995 – Tillie Olsen
 1995 – Paula Gunn Allen
 1994 – Alice Waters
 1994 – Angela Glover Blackwell
 1994 – Dennis A. Collins
 1993 – Margaret Wentworth Owings
 1993 – Eugene E. Trefethen, Jr.
 1992 – Kathleen Brown
 1992 – Jane Newhall '36
 1992 – Wilma Mankiller
 1992 – Virginia B. Smith
 1991 – Beate Sirota Gordon '43
 1990 – Carolyn Kizer
 1989 – April Glaspie
 1988 – Lou Harrison
 1987 – Madeleine Milhaud
 1986 – Rosalyn Yalow
 1986 – Jennifer Losch Bartlett '63
 1985 – Dianne Feinstein
 1985 – Anna Jane Harrison
 1984 – Sylvia F. Porter
 1984 – Mary E. Lanigar '38
 1982 – Ansel Adams
 1982 – Dave Brubeck 
 1980 – Esther R. Landa '33, MA '37
 1978 – James David Hart
 1977 – Carla Anderson Hills
 1976 – Constance Wong Ong (Jade Snow Wong) '42
 1976 – Robert Joseph Wert
 1975 – Maya Angelou
 1975 – Imogen Cunningham 
 1974 – Mary Woods Bennett
 1973 – Leslie Langnecker Luttgens
 1973 – Laura Thompson '27
 1973 – Eugene Edgar Trefethen, Jr.
 1972 – Richard Wall Lyman
 1972 – Mary Louise James O'Brien
 1970 – William Parmer Fuller Brawner
 1969 – Kenneth Sanborn Pitzer
 1968 – Walter Abraham Haas
 1968 – Edgar Fosburgh Kaiser
 1967 – Kathryn Grove Shipp
 1967 – Camille Mermod
 1967 – Dixy Lee Ray
 1967 – Darius Milhaud
 1967 – Charles Easton Rothwell
 1967 – John Ewart Wallace Sterling
 1966 – Marian Anderson
 1966 – Martha Graham
 1965 – Bernhard Blume
 1965 – Claire Giannini Hoffman
 1965 – Josephine Miles
 1965 – Maurine Brown Neuberger
 1964 – Dorothy Bullitt
 1964 – Constantinos Arostolou Doxiadis
 1964 – Sir George Bailey Sansom
 1964 – General Lauris Norstad
 1963 – Kate Hevner Mueller
 1963 – Virginia Foisie Rusk
 1963 – Ei Komada
 1963 – Phillips Talbot
 1962 – Katherine Esau
 1962 – Herbert Edwin Hall
 1962 – George Frederick Reinhardt
 1962 – Emma Moffat McLaughlin
 1961 – Charlotte D'Evelyn
 1961 – Margaret Habein
 1961 – Edith R. Mirrielees
 1961 – Luis Monguio
 1960 – Edith Margaret Coulter
 1960 – William Leonard Langer
 1960 – Wendell Meredith Stanley
 1959 – Cora Du Bois
 1958 – Angela Diller
 1958 – Georgia Elma Harkness
 1958 – John Edwin Pomfret
 1958 – Lynn Townsend White, Jr.
 1957 – Margaret Chase Smith
 1957 – Pearl Anderson Wanamaker
 1956 – George Keith Funston
 1955 – Helenor Campbell Wilder Foerster
 1955 – Edwin Grabhorn
 1955 – Agnes Ernst Meyer
 1954 – Katherine Fleming Branson
 1954 – Detlev Wulf Bronk
 1954 – Warren Olney III
 1953 – Flora Belle Ludington
 1953 – Marjorie Hope Nicolson
 1952 – Agnes George DeMille
 1952 – Lillian Moller Gilbreth
 1952 – Elinor Raas Heller
 1952 – Ruth Marian Leach
1952 – Patricia Newcomb
 1952 – Georgia O'Keeffe
 1952 – Helen Crocker Russell
 1952 – Esther Dayman Strong
 1952 – Katherine Amelia Towle
 1951 – Lotte Lehmann
 1951 – Stephen Fielding Bayne, Jr.
 1951 – William Fife Knowland
 1950 – Cornelia Otis Skinner
 1950 – Jessamyn West
 1950 – Annette Abbott Adams
 1950 – Rosalind Cassidy
 1949 – Sarah Gibson Blanding
 1949 – Earl Warren
 1949 – Alice Tisdale Hobart
 1949 – Dorothy McCullough Lee
 1948 – Barbara Nachtrieb Armstrong
 1948 – Dorothy Wright Liebes Morin
 1948 – David Dean Rusk
 1947 – Louis Booker Wright
 1947 – Lily Ross Taylor
 1947 – Gabriela Mistral
 1946 – Vera Brittain
 1946 – Edward Lambe Parsons
 1946 – Mary Yost
 1945 – Esther Caukin Brunauer
 1945 – Virginia Crocheron Gildersleeve
 1945 – Florence Horsbrugh
 1945 – Bertha Lutz
 1945 – Wu Yi-fang
 1945 – Herbert Vere Evatt
 1944 – German Arciniogas
 1944 – Mabel Ray Gillis
 1944 – Erico Vorissimo
 1943 – Aurelia Henry Reinhardt
 1943 – Robert Gordon Sproul
 1943 – Marian Long Stebbins
 1943 – Cornelia McKinney Stanwood
 1942 – Leonora Wood Armsby
 1942 – June Richardson Lucas
 1942 – Emma Moffat McLaughlin
 1942 – Hattie Hecht Sloss
 1942 – Jade Wong Wu
 1941 – Michi Kawai
 1940 – Dexter Morriam Keezer
 1940 – Frederic William Goudy
 1940 – Pearl Chase
 1939 – Eve Curie
 1939 – Louise Arner Boyd
 1939 – Althea Warren
 1939 – Pierre Monteux
 1939 – Dorothy Macardle
 1938 – Mary Emma Woolley
 1938 – Antonia Brico
 1937 – Olga Bridgman
 1937 – Yves Mario De Bellefon
 1937 – Robert French Leavens
 1937 – Anna Cox Brinton
 1937 – Charles Reynolds Brown
 1937 – William Edward Colby
 1937 – Monroe Emanuel Deutsch
 1937 – Katharine Folton
 1937 – Susan Myra Kingsbury
 1937 – Grace McCann Morley
 1937 – Maude Royden
 1937 – Roswell Gray Ham
 1936 – Frederick Morgan Padelford
 1936 – Jules Romains
 1935 – Robert Andrews Killikan
 1935 – Gertrude Atherton
 1935 – Jessica Blanche Peixotto
 1934 – Herman Phleger
 1934 – Clelia Duel Mosher 
 1934 – Joseph R. Knowland
 1934 – Albert Bender
 1933 – Frederic Logan Parson
 1933 – Lucy Ward Stebbins
 1933 – Kathleen Parlow
 1933 – Sara Bard Field
 1932 – Dorothy Frances Wilson
 1932 – Adelaide Brown
 1932 – Emily Wilson
 1931 – Robert Dollar
 1931 – William Bennet Munro
 1931 – Caroline Hazard
 1931 – Sara Margery Fry
 1929 – Charles Henry Rieber
 1928 – Elizabeth Sprague Coolidge
 1928 – Mary Hunter Austin
 1927 – Mary Roberts Coolidge
 1927 – Edwin Markham
 1925 – Norman Frank Coleman
 1925 – Clara Bradley Burdette
 1925 – William Frederic Badè
 1925 – William Andrews Clark, Jr.
 1925 – Hettie Belle Ege
 1925 – Albert Maurice Bender
 1925 – David Prescott Barrows
 1925 – Luella Clay Carson
 1923 – Melville Best Anderson
 1923 – Ina Donna Coolbrith
 1923 – Lou Henry Hoover
 1923 – Bernard Ralph Maybeck
 1923 – John Henry Nash
 1920 – Lucinda Wyman Prince
 1903 – Jane Cordelia Tolman
 1902 – Emma Wixom Palmer
 1902 – Louis Lisser

See also
 Mills College

References

Honorary degrees
Mills College
United States education-related lists